Anthony Paul Beke (born 20 July 1966), known professionally as Anton Du Beke, is a British ballroom and Latin dancer,  and television presenter, best known for being a professional dancer and later a judge on the BBC One celebrity dancing show, Strictly Come Dancing, since the show began in 2004. His professional dance partner since 1997 has been Erin Boag.

In 2009, he presented the United Kingdom version of Hole in the Wall, for the BBC, replacing Dale Winton after being a team captain in 2008. In November 2017, Beke released his debut studio album, From the Top, on Polydor Records. It reached number 21 on the UK Albums Chart.

Family and early life
Beke was born in Sevenoaks, Kent, to a Hungarian father, Antal Xavier Beke (1939–2001), and a Spanish mother, Ascensión "Conchita" Lema. He has two younger siblings, brother Stephen and his sister Veronica. He attended Wildernesse School in Sevenoaks. 

Beke began dancing at 14, when he discovered his local dance school, the Holton School of Dancing in Sevenoaks. He had three partners during these formative years before the Holton School of Dancing closed in 1987. Du Beke left school at 16 to follow an amateur dancing career. At 17, he decided to specialise in ballroom. While he danced during the evenings and at weekends, he had a day job as a salesman in "The Bed Post" in Petts Wood, South London. He dated television presenter Caroline Feraday from 2007 to 2008.

Du Beke lives in Buckinghamshire with his wife Hannah Summers. In November 2016 the couple announced they were expecting twins, due in spring 2017. On 30 March 2017, his son George and daughter Henrietta were born, announced with an Instagram post.

Career

Dance career
Du Beke's regular professional partner is Erin Boag. They met in 1997, and won the 1998 and 1999 New Zealand Championships. They turned professional in 2002, competing mainly in the United Kingdom. Their best result on the competition circuit was in November 2003 when they won the IDTA Classic in Brighton.

Strictly Come Dancing

Highest and lowest scoring performances per dance

Du Beke has appeared in every series of the BBC's Strictly Come Dancing since its inception. In the first series, he danced with singer Lesley Garrett and finished in third place. For the second series, he partnered presenter Esther Rantzen; they were eliminated in the third week. He danced with actress Patsy Palmer for the third series and finished in fifth place. In the fourth series, he danced with actress and impressionist Jan Ravens but was eliminated in week 5 of the competition. His partner for the fifth series was TV presenter Kate Garraway; the couple were voted out in week 7. His partner for the sixth series was actress Gillian Taylforth; the couple were voted out in week 2. In series seven, he was partnered with Laila Rouass. Together, they made it to week 12.

In series 8, he partnered Conservative politician Ann Widdecombe. Despite Widdecombe's poor dancing ability, they made it through to the quarter final. For its ninth series, Nancy Dell'Olio was Anton's partner, the couple were eliminated in week 5. His partner for the tenth series was model and actress Jerry Hall. They were eliminated in week 3. His partner for series 11 was actress Fiona Fullerton. They were eliminated in week 8 in Blackpool. For the show's twelfth series, his partner was tennis coach Judy Murray. They were also eliminated on week 8 in Blackpool. For series 13, Du Beke was partnered with newscaster and presenter Katie Derham they made it to Du Beke's first final in all 13 series and were eliminated in fourth place.

In series 14, Du Beke was partnered with actress Lesley Joseph. They were eliminated in week 5. In series 15 in 2017, Du Beke was paired with television presenter Ruth Langsford. In 2018 Anton was partnered with Fashion Journalist Susannah Constantine. They finished last (the first time Du Beke had ever done this) with an average of 12.00 (Du Beke's lowest). For the 17th series, he was partnered with Emma Barton. In Week 9, Du Beke received his first 10s in all 17 series for their American Smooth; the couple received a total of fifteen 10s during the series. They finished joint runners-up alongside Karim Zeroual and Amy Dowden, but lost out to Kelvin Fletcher and Oti Mabuse. In 2020 Du Beke was partnered with former home secretary Jacqui Smith. They were eliminated in week 2 (first), Du Beke's second time finishing last.

Du Beke has also appeared in a number of Children in Need and Christmas Specials of Strictly Come Dancing. In 2008 he won the Children in Need 2008 special, dancing an American Smooth with Tess Daly. He danced once again with Anne Widdecombe in the 2012 Children in Need special but lost out to Russell Grant and Flavia Cacace. He did however go on to win the Children in Need 2014 special where he and fellow dancer Natalie Lowe taught a group of children how to dance. Du Beke has also reprised his partnerships with Lesley Garret and Ann Widdecombe for the 2004 and 2018 Christmas specials, respectively. He has also danced with Ronni Ancona, Su Pollard, Katy Brand and Denise Lewis in the respective 2010, 2011, 2012 and 2016 Christmas specials. In 2015 Du Beke served as a judge on The People's Strictly, a one off version of the show where non-celebrities compete for the charity Comic Relief. In 2020, he reprised his role as a judge for weeks 4 and 5 to fill in for Motsi Mabuse who needed to quarantine after travelling to Germany. On 24 June 2021, it was announced that Du Beke would become a permanent judge on Strictly Come Dancing for series 19, starting in September 2021, replacing Bruno Tonioli.

Other television appearances
Du Beke's first TV appearance was as a backing dancer in Madonna's video Material Girl.

In March 2007 Du Beke was a contestant on the BBC Two series The Underdog Show and was paired with homeless dog Ginger. They were eliminated in week three of the competition.

Du Beke has presented the BBC cookery show Step Up to the Plate. He served as a captain and from series 2 was the host on the UK version of Hole in the Wall, which premiered on 20 September 2008 on BBC One. On 24 December 2009, he appeared in Victoria Wood's Midlife Christmas, in a sketch called "Beyond The Marigolds", where he spoofed his Strictly Come Dancing role by being paired with fictional soap star "Bo Beaumont" (played by Julie Walters). Beaumont quit the show when unable to master Du Beke's warm up steps.

During the week of 5 to 9 May 2014, Du Beke appeared on Channel 4 game show Draw It!.

On Christmas Day 2019, Du Beke surprised Craig Revel Horwood as a guest in the Christmas Midnight Gameshow in Michael McIntyre's Big Christmas Show.

Strictly Come Dancing performances

Series 1 – with celebrity partner Lesley Garrett, Du Beke was placed 3rd.

Series 2 – with celebrity partner Esther Rantzen, Du Beke was placed 8th.

Series 3 – with celebrity partner Patsy Palmer; placed 5th

Series 4 – with celebrity partner Jan Ravens; placed 9th

Series 5 – with celebrity partner Kate Garraway; placed 8th

Series 6 – with celebrity partner Gillian Taylforth; placed 15th

Series 7 – with celebrity partner Laila Rouass; placed 4th

1 Rouass and Du Beke only performed half of their routine, due to an injury.2 Scores from guest judge Darcey Bussell.

Series 8 – with celebrity partner Ann Widdecombe; placed 6th

Series 9 – with celebrity partner Nancy Dell'Olio; placed 11th

Series 10 – with celebrity partner Jerry Hall; placed 13th

Series 11 – with celebrity partner Fiona Fullerton; placed 9th

Series 12 – with celebrity partner Judy Murray; placed 9th

3 Score from guest judge Donny Osmond.

Series 13 – with celebrity partner Katie Derham; placed 4th

Series 14 – with celebrity partner Lesley Joseph; placed 11th

Series 15 – with celebrity partner Ruth Langsford; placed 9th

4Tonioli was absent due to working on Dancing with the Stars (US TV series)

Series 16 – with celebrity partner Susannah Constantine; placed 15th

Series 17 – with celebrity partner Emma Barton; placed 2nd

In week 9, at Blackpool, dancing an American Smooth, Du Beke scored his first ever 10s.

5Score awarded by guest judge Alfonso Ribeiro

Series 18 – with celebrity partner Jacqui Smith; placed 12th

Discography
From the Top (2017)

Books
Du Beke has released a book called Anton's Dance Class which was serialised in the Mail on Sunday. Du Beke also wrote an A–Z of ballroom dancing, B is for Ballroom.

In October 2018, Du Beke released his debut novel One Enchanted Evening. Du Beke has now released five novels which have all been set around the Buckingham Hotel and characters Raymond and Nancy:

One Enchanted Evening (2018)
Moonlight over Mayfair (2019)
A Christmas to Remember (2020) 
We'll Meet Again (November 2021)
The Ballroom Blitz (2022)

Dance tours 
In September 2022, Du Beke and Erin Boag announced they were to appear at "Dancing With The Stars Weekends" 2023.

In June 2020, Du Beke and  Erin Boag announced a 3-month 2021 UK Tour "SHOWTIME".

In September 2020, Du Beke and Giovanni Pernice announced a 2021 UK Tour "HIM & ME".

Philanthropy 
Du Beke is an honorary patron of The Music Hall Guild of Great Britain and America.

References

External links
 
 
 
 

1966 births
British ballroom dancers
English people of Hungarian descent
English people of Spanish descent
British television personalities
British television presenters
Living people
People from Sevenoaks